Mahmatlıbahçe is a village in the District of Gölbaşı, Ankara Province, Turkey.

References

Villages in Gölbaşı District, Ankara Province